George Richard Bevan (born May 5, 1959) is an American attorney and jurist who currently is the chief justice of Idaho. He previously served as an Idaho district court judge from 2003 until 2017, when he was appointed to the supreme court.

Early life and education
Born and raised in Twin Falls, Idaho, Bevan graduated from Twin Falls High School in 1977, and then attended Brigham Young University in Provo, Utah. He earned a Bachelor of Science in business management and finance in 1984, and completed a Juris Doctor at the J. Reuben Clark Law School

Career 
Bevan served as the Twin Falls County prosecuting attorney from 1993 to 1997 as   partner in the law firm Hillifield & Bevan

Idaho District Court
In 2003, Governor Dirk Kempthorne appointed Bevan as a state judge on the Idaho District Court for the 5th judicial district, which covers the south central portion of the state. He was re-elected in 2006, 2010, 

Bevan was considered by Idaho's Senators Mike Crapo and Jim Risch for a possible nomination as a federal judge, but David Nye was selected

Idaho Supreme Court
In April 2017, Idaho Supreme Court justice Dan Eismann announced that he would retire on August 31. The Idaho Judicial Council provided Governor Butch Otter with four replacement candidates to choose from: Bevan, state judges John Stegner and Greg Moeller, and attorney Rebecca Rainey. Otter announced on August 29 that he had selected Bevan for the vacancy; Stegner was appointed to the court the following May.

Bevan was sworn in as a justice of the supreme court on September 27, 2017. Unopposed in the 2018 election, his current term expires  the nonpartisan election is held within the statewide primary election  Through a vote of his peers on the supreme court, he was elected chief justice in November 2020 and began serving in that capacity on January 1, 2021.

References

|-

1959 births
21st-century American judges
Brigham Young University alumni
Chief Justices of the Idaho Supreme Court
J. Reuben Clark Law School alumni
Justices of the Idaho Supreme Court
Living people
People from Twin Falls, Idaho